Lapshinskaya is a rural locality (a settlement) and the administrative center of Lapshinskoye Rural Settlement, Kotovsky District, Volgograd Oblast, Russia. The population was 790 as of 2010. There are 18 streets.

Geography 
The village is located in forest steppe, on Volga Upland, on the left bank of the Mokraya Olkhovka River, 240 km from Volgograd, 22 km from Kotovo.

References 

Rural localities in Kotovsky District